Diego Ivan Bogado (born 23 February 1986, in Buenos Aires) is an Argentine association football player, who currently plays for  PS Mojokerto Putra

Club career
Bogado began his career 1996 in the youth side for Club Atlético River Plate and was 2006 promoted to the seniorside, who served as a sparring partner in the senior squad under the command of coach Marcelo Bielsa in the Copa América in Peru. He made his professional debut in Argentina's first division playing for River Plate, where he played through 2010. After sixteen years left in March 2011 his club Club Atlético River Plate and joined to Bogor Raya F.C. With 12 games played, he is one of the most valuable players of Indonesia football.

Notes

External links
https://www.youtube.com/watch?v=r2MtwZH72Ic. 
https://www.youtube.com/watch?v=zx0VM1JqylE.
https://www.youtube.com/watch?v=DrFLs9OEdzo.

1986 births
Living people
Argentine footballers
Association football midfielders
Club Atlético River Plate footballers
Expatriate footballers in Indonesia
Footballers from Buenos Aires